Philip A. Newmark is an American biologist, focusing in developmental biology and parasitology, currently at Howard Hughes Medical Institute and University of Wisconsin and an Elected Fellow of the American Association for the Advancement of Science.

References

Year of birth missing (living people)
Living people
Fellows of the American Association for the Advancement of Science
University of Wisconsin–Madison faculty
21st-century American biologists